Kārlis Aleksandrs Princis (11 October 1893 – 25 March 1978) was a Latvian-born biologist who contributed to the study of the Blattodea while working at the Museum at Riga and later in Sweden. 

Princis was born in Venta, near Ventspils and was educated at the  Riga Polytechnic. He served during World War I in the Russian army and returned to the university, receiving a master's degree in 1934 and joining the Zoological Institute in 1940. He became a director of the Museum of Natural History at Riga in 1942. In 1944 he took refuge in Sweden with assistance from N.A. Kemner at Lund University. He lived in Vastmanland in 1973 and died at a hospital in Västerås.

Princis' most important work was on the systematics of cockroaches which he published as a volume of Junk's Orthopterorum Catalogus. He received an honorary Ph.D. in 1964 from the University of Lund.

References 

1893 births
1978 deaths
People from Ventspils Municipality
People from Courland Governorate
Livonian people
Latvian biologists
Entomologists
Academic staff of the University of Latvia
Latvian World War II refugees
Latvian emigrants to Sweden